Gillis Valckenier (1623–1680) was nine years burgomaster of Amsterdam: in 1665, 1666, 1668, 1670, 1673, 1674, 1676, 1678, 1679. He was a strong personality, but changing allies as a real opportunist.

Life
Valckenier was the only son of Wouter Valckenier, mayor of Amsterdam. His grandfather Gillis Jansz. was related to Adriaen Pauw, joined the board of the Admiralty of Amsterdam, and was captain in the civic guard. Gillis studied law at the University of Leiden. In 1649 he was appointed as schepen, in 1652 as member of the vroedschap and in 1657 as administrator of the Dutch East India Company. From 1666 onwards he was involved in the education of William III of Orange, just like Johan de Witt and Cornelis de Graeff. In the year after he signed the Perpetual Edict (1667) ... for Preserving of Freedom, as the law was entitled, was duly passed and promogated. Its three chief points were abolition of the stadholderate, permanent separation of the captaincy-general from the stadholderate of all provinces, and the transfer of the political functions of the Stadholder of Holland to the provincial States. In 1670 he became an orangist and supported the cancellation of the Perpetual Edict in July 1672.

After the political struggle of the republican families De Witt and De Graeff in the rampjaar 1672, Nicolaes Witsen and Johannes Hudde became his opponents in the vroedschap. He had insulted Dirck Tulp and Lambert Reynst; in total sixteen members of the city council lost their seat, jobs on his advice, including Andries de Graeff. When Coenraad van Beuningen was sent to England as a diplomat, and Henrick Hooft died, Valckenier was more powerful than ever. William Temple wrote in as Observations upon the United Provinces: The Turkish sultan was not as powerful in his country, than Valckenier in Amsterdam, (dressing and behaving like a shopkeeper).

In 1648 Valckenier married Jacoba Rans (1622–1676); the couple had at least seven children. They lived at Jodenbreestraat and were buried in the Zuiderkerk. Their son Wouter married a daughter of Louis Trip. Clara Valckenier married Joseph Coymans (1656–1720). Their grandson, Adriaan Valckenier, became in 1737 a Governor-General of the Dutch East Indies.

References

1623 births
1680 deaths
Mayors of Amsterdam